Cellana craticulata is a species of sea snail, a marine gastropod mollusk in the family Nacellidae, one of the families of true limpets

References

Nacellidae